The list of clinical trial registries includes any clinical trial registration system managed by a government or other organization.

List
Since 2007, the International Committee of Medical Journal Editors (ICMJE) accepts all primary registries in the WHO network in addition to clinicaltrials.gov. The complete list from the ICMJE is as follows:

Australia and New Zealand's (ANZCTR)
Brazilian Clinical Trials Registry (ReBec)
Chinese Clinical Trial Registry (ChiCTR)
Clinical Research Information Service (CRiS), Republic of Korea
Clinical Trials Registry - India (CTRI)
Cuban Public Registry of Clinical Trials (RPCEC)
EU Clinical Trials Register (EU-CTR)
German Clinical Trials Register (DRKS)
Iranian Registry of Clinical Trials (IRCT)
Japan Primary Registries Network
The Netherlands Trial Register
Pan African Clinical Trial Registry (PACTR)
Peruvian Registry of Clinical Trials
Philippine Health Research Registry
Sri Lanka Clinical Trials Registry (SLCTR)
South African National Clinical Trials Register
Swiss FOPH Human Research Projects
Tanzania Clinical Trial Registry
Thai Clinical Trials Registry
The United Kingdom's ISRCTN registry
The United States' ClinicalTrials.gov

International 
The World Health Organization's International Clinical Trials Registry Platform (ICTRP) acts as a voluntary coordinating body for many international registries, including many of those listed below.

By country

Africa
The Pan-African clinical trials registry (PACTR) is available at pactr.org. It is funded by the European and Developing Countries Clinical Trials Partnership (EDCTP) and operates out of the South African Cochrane Centre (Cochrane Collaboration) based at the South African Medical Research Council. PACTR's remit ensures that it can register all clinical trials that are conducted on the continent in all disease areas. PACTR is a primary member of the WHO's International Clinical Trials Registry Platform (ICTRP), and thus contributes data to the central search portal hosted by ICTRP.

Australia and New Zealand
The countries of Australia and New Zealand share a registry. The ANZCTR is located at: anzctr.org.au.

Registering trials with the ANZCTR is voluntary. It is publicly owned and managed by a non-profit organization and is funded by an enabling grant from Australia's National Health and Medical Research Council (NHMRC). The registry is in English.

Brazil
Brazil has a registry (the Registro Brasileiro de Ensaios Clínicos, abbreviated ReBEC) at: ensaiosclinicos.gov.br. ReBEC is a project of the Brazilian Ministry of Health, The Panamerican Health Organization (PAHO) and The Oswaldo Cruz Foundation (FIOCRUZ).

Canada
The Canadian Institutes of Health Research (CIHR) participates with the ISRCTN.

China
China's clinical trial registry is called ChiCTR and its website is (http://www.chictr.org.cn). It is available both in Chinese (Mandarin) and English.

ChiCTR was established in October 2005, one week after India's registry was established and it participates in the World Health Organization’s International Clinical Trials Registry Platform.

Cuba
Cuba's clinical registry is the RPCEC (Cuban Public Registry of Clinical Trials).

Europe

EudraCT is a database of all clinical trials conducted in the European Union from 1 May 2004 onward. Initially a non-public database, it was launched for the public as EU Clinical Trials Register in March 2011.

Germany
Germany's clinical trials registry, the DRKS, is available at www.drks.de. The DRKS is an open access, free of charge online register for clinical trials and is available both in English and German. DRKS is part of the ICTRP network at WHO. The DRKS works with two partner registries in Germany, DeReG - German Registry for Somatic Gene-Transfer Trials and Clinical Trial Registry of the University Medical Center Freiburg.

India
India's clinical trials registry is Clinical Trials Registry – India.

CTRI is in English and it participates in the World Health Organization’s International Clinical Trials Registry Platform.

Iran
Iran's registry, the IRCT, is available at irct.ir. It is run and funded by the Iranian Ministry of Health and Medical Education.

Italy
Italy's The Portal of the Clinical Research with Medicines of the Italian Medicines Agency (AIFA) is a public source of information about the clinical trials with medicines conducted in Italy, the regulations and the ethical principles ruling the research, as well as the initiatives that AIFA promotes in the field of research. Unfortunately the portal has not been working since January 2013, for technical reasons; although it was expected to restart soon, an operational date has not yet been posted so far (July 2013).

Japan
Japan has three registries that work as a network known as the Japan Primary Registries Network (JPRN). Its search portal is hosted by the Japanese National Institute of Public Health. While the search portal is only available in Japanese, the three registries' sites are also available in English:
 University Hospital Medical Information Network (UMIN CTR)
 Japan Pharmaceutical Information Center - Clinical Trials Information (JapicCTI)
 Japan Medical Association - Center for Clinical Trials (JMACCT CTR)

Netherlands
The Netherlands registry participates with WHO and its website is trialregister.nl. While the "About" sections of the website are only available in the Dutch language, clinical trial data are available in English.

South Africa
South Africa’s Department of Health announced in November 2005, that clinical trials conducted in the country must be submitted to the South African National Clinical Trials Register. Its site is located at: sanctr.gov. Clinical trial guidelines for South Africa are available at the Department of Health's official site.

South Korea
South Korea's registry is Clinical Research Information Service (CRiS) and available at https://web.archive.org/web/20101121001837/http://ncrc.cdc.go.kr/cris/index.jsp. It is managed by the Korea Centers for Disease Control and Prevention and funded by South Korea's Ministry of Health and Welfare.

Sri Lanka
The Sri Lanka Clinical Trials Registry (SLCTR) is available at slctr.lk. It is funded by the Sri Lanka Medical Association and managed by the Sri Lanka Clinical Trials Registry Committee.

United Kingdom
The ISRCTN registry was launched in 2000. Originally ISRCTN stood for 'International Standard Randomised Controlled Trial Number'; however, the scope of the registry has now widened beyond randomized controlled trials to include any study designed to assess the efficacy of health interventions in a human population. It registers both observational and interventional trials and content is curated by a team of expert editors.

United States

Clinical trials in the US are registered on clinicaltrials.gov.

Clinicaltrials.gov is the largest clinical trials registry. Clinical trials conducted in the United States are required to be registered in the registry. As of January 2, 2015, ClinicalTrials.gov lists 181,612 studies with locations in 50 US states and in 187 countries. Its registrations represent about 75% of what is available through the WHO Portal (ICTRP). Despite the fact that important progress has been made, the efforts of those overseeing ClinicalTrials.gov and the other, smaller, registries do not ensure that the public has an unbiased knowledge base accessible to all.  For example, problems of the concordance between the ClinicalTrials.gov record and the published record have been identified for many protocol and results items.

The registry traces back to the Health Omnibus Programs Extension Act of 1988 (HOPE or Public Law 100-607) which mandated the development of a database of AIDS Clinical Trials Information System. It would later be expanded under the Food and Drug Administration Modernization Act of 1997 (FDAMA or Public Act 105-115). The registry is run by the United States National Library of Medicine (NLM).

Other registries
Clinical trial registries are also set up and managed by governmental organizations, non-governmental organizations, universities, as well as commercial and nonprofit entities. This includes pharmaceutical companies, international organizations, and health organizations. A list is available at http://www.circare.org/registries.htm.

The IFPMA Clinical Trials Portal is a major pharmaceutical industry initiative designed to increase the transparency of clinical trials by providing a convenient "one-stop-shop" for published clinical trial information. It helps to fulfill the commitment made by the research-based pharmaceutical industry in its Joint Position on the Disclosure of Clinical Trial Information via Clinical Trial Registries and Databases. It is available here.

References

Clinical trials